Emma Lee Pettway Campbell (1928–2002) was an American artist associated with the Gee's Bend group of quilters. She was included in the 2013 History Refused to Die exhibition at the Metropolitan Museum of Art. Her work is included in the collection of the Metropolitan Museum of Art, to which it was donated by the Souls Grown Deep Foundation.

References

1922 births
2002 deaths
20th-century American women artists
20th-century American artists
American quilters
Artists from Alabama
African-American women artists
21st-century African-American people
21st-century African-American women
20th-century African-American artists
20th-century African-American women
20th-century African-American people